This is a list of mayors of Sault Ste. Marie, Ontario. The mayor presides over Sault Ste. Marie City Council.

Mayors
 1912 - W. H. Munro
 1913-14 - T. E. Simpson
 1915-16 - J. A. McPhail
 1917 - F. E. Crawford
 1918 - Thomas Dean
 1919 - George A. Boyd 
 1920-21 - Thomas Farquhar
 1922-25 - James Dawson
 1926-29 - Thomas J. Irwin
 1930-31 - John McLarty
 1932-34 - James Lyons
 1935-36 - Richard McMeekin
 1937-45 - W. John McMeeken
 1946-49 - William H.C. Brien
 1950-56 - C. Herbert Smale
 1957-59 - Walter Harry
 1960-64 - James L. McIntyre
 1965-68 - Alexander C. Harry
 1969-71 - John Rhodes
 1972-74 - Ron Irwin
 1975-80 - Nicholas Trbovich
 1981-85 - Donald M. Macgregor
 1986-96 - Joe Fratesi
 1996 - Michael Sanzosti (acting)
 1996-2000 - Steve Butland
 2001 - August 31, 2010 - John Rowswell
 September 2010 - Lorena Tridico (acting)
 October 2010 - Susan Myers (acting)
 November 2010 - Ozzie Grandinetti (acting)
 December 1, 2010 - November 30, 2014 - Debbie Amaroso
 December 1, 2014 - present - Christian Provenzano
 November 15, 2022 - Matthew Shoemaker

References

Sault Ste. Marie